Bangime (or, in full) is a language isolate spoken by 3,500 ethnic Dogon in seven villages in southern Mali, who call themselves the  ("hidden people"). Bangande is the name of the ethnicity of this community and their population grows at a rate of 2.5% per year. The Bangande consider themselves to be Dogon, but other Dogon people insist they are not. Bangime is an endangered language classified as 6a - Vigorous by Ethnologue. Long known to be highly divergent from the (other) Dogon languages, it was first proposed as a possible isolate by Blench (2005). Research since then has confirmed that it appears to be unrelated to neighbouring languages. Heath and Hantgan have hypothesized that the cliffs surrounding the Bangande valley provided isolation of the language as well as safety for Bangande people. Even though Bangime is not related to Dogon languages, the Bangande still consider their language to be Dogon. Hantgan and List report that Bangime speakers seem unaware that it is not mutually intelligible with any Dogon language.

Roger Blench, who discovered the language was not a Dogon language, notes,

This language contains some Niger–Congo roots but is lexically very remote from all other languages in West Africa. It is presumably the last remaining representative of the languages spoken prior to the expansion of the Dogon proper,

which he dates to 3,000–4,000 years ago.

Bangime has been characterised as an anti-language, i.e., a language that serves to prevent its speakers from being understood by outsiders, possibly associated with the Bangande villages having been a refuge for escapees from slave caravans.

Blench (2015) suggests that Bangime and Dogon languages have a substratum from a "missing" branch of Nilo-Saharan that had split off relatively early from Proto-Nilo-Saharan, and tentatively calls that branch "Plateau".

Locations
Health and Hantgan report that Bangime is spoken in the Bangande valley, which cuts into the western edge of the Dogon high plateau in eastern Mali. Blench reports that Bangime is spoken in 7 villages east of Karge, near Bandiagara, Mopti Region, central Mali (Blench 2007). The villages are:

 Bara (IPA: [bara])
 Bounou (IPA: [bunu])
 Niana (IPA: [ɲana]) (also called Nani)
 Die'ni (IPA: [jene])
 Digari (IPA: [diɡarɔ]) (also called Digarou)
 Doro (IPA: [dɔrɔ])
 Due (IPA: [ʔjeni])

Morphology
Bangime uses various morphological processes, including clitics, affixation, reduplication, compounding, and tone change. It does not use case-marking for noun phrase subjects and objects. Bangime is a largely isolating language. The only productive affixes are the plural and a diminutive, which are seen in the words for the people and language above.

Affixation 
Bangime has both prefixation and suffixation. The following chart provides examples of affixation.

Compounding 
Bangime creates some words by compounding two morphemes together. A nasal linker is often inserted between the two morphemes. This linker matches the following consonant's place of articulation, with /m/ used before labials, /n/ before alveolars, and /ŋ/ before velars. Below are examples of compound words in Bangime.

Reduplicative compounds 
Some compound words in Bangime are formed by full or partial reduplication. The following chart contains some examples. In the chart, v indicates a vowel (v̀ is a low tone, v̄ is a mid tone, v́ is a high tone), C indicates a consonant, and N indicates a nasal phoneme. Subscripts are used to show the reduplication of more than one vowel (v1 and v2). The repeated segment is shown in bold. Partial reduplication is also seen alongside a change in vowel quality. The chart also displays a few examples of this.

Tone changes 
Another morphological process used in Bangime is tone changes. One example of this is that the tones on vowels denote the tense of the word. For example, keeping the same vowel but changing a high tone to a low tone changes the tense from future to imperfective 1st person singular.

Low tone is used for the tenses of imperfective 1st person singular, deontic, imperative singular, and perfective 3rd person singular. They are also used for perfective 3rd person singular along with an additional morpheme. High tone is used for the future tense.

Phonology

Vowels 
Bangime has 28 vowels. The chart below lists 7 short oral vowels, each of which can be long, nasalized, or both. All these vowel types can occur phonetically, but short nasalized vowels are sometimes allophones of oral vowels. This occurs when they are adjacent to nasalized semivowels (/wⁿ/ [w̃] and /jⁿ/ [j̃]) or /ɾⁿ/ [ɾ̃]. Long nasalized vowels are more common as phonemes than short nasalized vowels.

Vowels have an ±ATR distinction, which affects neighbouring consonants, but unusually for such systems, there is no ATR vowel harmony in Bangime.

Consonants 
Bangime has 22 consonant phonemes, shown in the chart below. Consonants that appear in square brackets are the IPA symbol, when different from the symbol used by A Grammar of Bangime. A superscript "n" indicates a nasalized consonant. Sounds in parentheses are either allophones or limited to use in loanwords, onomatopoeias, etc.

NC sequences tend to drop the plosive, and often lenite to a nasalized sonorant: [búndà] ~ [búr̃a] ~ [bún] 'finish', [támbà] ~ [táw̃à] ~ [támà] 'chew'.

/b/ and /ɡ/ appear as [ʋ] and [ɣ], depending on the ATR status of the adjacent vowels.

/s/ appears as [ʃ] before non-low vowels, /t/ and /j/ as [tʃ] and [ʒ] before either of the high front vowels. /j/ is realized as [dʒ] after a nasal.

Tone 
Bangime uses high, mid, and low tone levels as well as contoured tones (used in the last syllable of a word). There are three tones on moras(short syllables): high, low and rising. In addition, falling tone may occur on long (bimoraic) syllables. Syllables may also have no inherent tone. Each morpheme has a lexical tone melody of /H/, /M/, or /L/ (high, mid, or low, respectively) for level tones or /LH/, /HL/, or /ML/ for contoured tones. Nouns, adjectives, and numerals have lexical tone melodies. Terracing can also occur, giving a single level pitch to multiple words. Stem morphemes (such as nouns and verbs) may contain tonal ablaut/stem-wide tone overlays. For example, in nouns with determiners (definite or possessor), the determined form of the noun uses the opposite tone of the first tone in the lexical melody. A few examples of this process are listed in the chart below.

Phrases and clauses can show tone sandhi.

Syllable Structure 
Bangime allows for the syllable types C onset, CC onset, and C code, giving a syllable structure of (C)CV(C). The only consonants used as codas are the semivowels /w/ and /j/ and their corresponding nasalized phonemes. Usually, only monosyllabic words end in consonants. The following chart displays examples of these syllable types. For words with multiple syllables, syllables are separated by periods and the syllable of interest is bolded.

Syntax

Basic word order 
The subject noun phrase is always clause-initial in Bangime, apart from some clause-initial particles. In simple transitive sentences, SOV (subject, object, verb) word order is used for the present tense, imperfective and SVO (subject, verb, object) word order is used for the past tense, perfective.

Examples of SOV word order

Examples of SVO word order

Intransitive sentences

Word order in phrases 
Below are some examples of word order in various phrases.

DETERMINER + NOUN PHRASE

POSSESSOR + POSSESSEE

NOUN PHRASE + ADPOSITION

Focalization 
Bangime allows for the focalization of noun phrases, prepositional phrases, adverbs, and verbs.

Verb focalization

Noun phrase focalization (Nonsubject)

Noun phrase focalization (Demonstrative)

Noun phrase focalization (Subject)

Adverbial focalization

Prepositional phrase focalization

Polar interrogatives 
Bangime uses [à], a clause-final particle, after a statement to make it a yes/no question. This particle is glossed with a Q. Below are some examples.

Wh-questions 
Wh-words are focalized in Bangime. Below are some examples for these interrogatives.

Particles

Topic particle 
The topic particle is [hɔ̀ɔ̀ⁿ] and this morpheme follows a noun phrase. The following example shows a topical constituent preceding a clause.

"Only" particle 
The morpheme [pàw] can mean either 'all' or 'only.' The following example shows this morpheme as an 'only' quantifier.

See also
Bangime word list (Wiktionary)

References

Bibliography
 Blench, Roger, Bangime description and word list (2005)(2007)

External links
Bangime at the Dogon languages and Bangime project

Languages of Mali
Language isolates of Africa
Isolating languages
Tonal languages